"The Emperor Jones" is a television play episode of the American television anthology series Kraft Television Theatre. It was directed by Fielder Cook, starred Ossie Davis in the title role and aired on 23 February 1955.

O'Neill's play opened on Broadway, New York City, New York, USA at the Neighborhood Playhouse on 1 November 1920 and ran for 204 performances.

Plot summary

Cast
 Ossie Davis as Brutus Jones

References

External links
 

1955 television plays
1955 American television episodes
Black-and-white television episodes
Kraft Television Theatre
Television anthology episodes
Television shows based on plays